Leszno Voivodeship was a unit of administrative division and local government in Poland from 1975 to 1998, superseded by Greater Poland Voivodeship. Its capital city was Leszno.

Major cities and towns (population in 1995)
 Leszno (61,300)
 Kościan (24,600)
 Rawicz (21,500)
 Gostyń (20,600)

See also
 Voivodeships of Poland

References 

Former administrative regions of Greater Poland
Former voivodeships of Poland (1975–1998)